Rabdophaga strobilina is a gall midge which forms galls on the buds of some species of willow (Salix species). It was first described by Hermann Loew in 1850.

Description
The gall is green, reddish, later black but never hairy. The leaves of the terminal bud are slightly thickened, sometimes crinkled and curled into an elongate gall, which can be hidden by older leaves. Inside the gall is an elongate cavity with orange or reddish larvae numbering from one to forty.

It is uncertain whether white larvae are the young larvae of R. terminalis or inquilines, Macrolabis saliceti and/or R. strobilina.

The gall has been found on the following species:
 Salix alba – white willow
 Salix babylonica – Babylon willow
 Salix caesia 
 Salix excelsa 
 Salix × fragilis – crack willow
 Salix pentandra – bay willow
 Salix purpurea – purple willow
 Salix triandra – almond willow
 Salix viminalis – osier
 Salix viridis

Distribution
The insect or gall has been found in Belgium and the United Kingdom.

References

terminalis
Nematoceran flies of Europe
Gall-inducing insects
Insects described in 1850
Taxa named by Hermann Loew
Willow galls